Borok is a rural locality (a village) in Petushinskoye Rural Settlement, Petushinsky District, Vladimir Oblast, Russia. The population was 10 as of 2010.

Geography 
Borok is located 16 km southwest of Petushki (the district's administrative centre) by road. Chashcha is the nearest rural locality.

References 

Rural localities in Petushinsky District